Igliczyzna  is a village in the administrative district of Gmina Bartniczka, within Brodnica County, Kuyavian-Pomeranian Voivodeship, in north-central Poland.

The village has a population of 90.

References

Igliczyzna